The 2004 Yonex All England Open was the 94th edition of the All England Open Badminton Championships. It was held in Birmingham, England, from 9 to 14 March 2004, and the prize money was US$125,000 or £69,471.

Venue
National Indoor Arena

Final results

Men's singles

Section 1

Section 2

Women's singles

Section 1

Section 2

References

External links
Horizon-sport.com: Yonex All England Open Badminton Championships 2003

All England Open Badminton Championships
All England Open
All England
Sports competitions in Birmingham, West Midlands
March 2004 sports events in the United Kingdom